Rapke is a surname. Notable people with the surname include:

 Jack Rapke, American film producer
 Jeremy Rapke, Australian lawyer
 Julia Rapke (1886–1959), Australian-Jewish women's rights activist

See also
 Radke